The 1998 Romanian Open was a men's tennis tournament played on Clay in Bucharest, Romania that was part of the World Series of the 1998 ATP Tour. It was the sixth edition of the tournament and was held from 14 September – 21 September.

Seeds
Champion seeds are indicated in bold text while text in italics indicates the round in which those seeds were eliminated.

Draw

Finals

Top half

Bottom half

References

External links
 Main draw

Singles
Romanian Open
1998 in Romanian tennis